Petroravenia friesii is a species in the family Brassicaceae native to Chile. It was formerly called Eudema friesii before being transferred to Petroravenia in 2012 because of the lack of septum diving the fruit into chambers.

References

Brassicaceae
Flora of Chile